Alsószölnök is a village in Vas County, Hungary. Until 1945 it had a German majority.

Notable people
Jožef Košič - József Kossics (1788–1867), Slovenian writer
Jožef Sakovič - József Szakovics (1874–1930), Slovenian Roman Catholic priest

Populated places in Vas County
Hungarian Slovenes